Joseph Maurice McDonald (July 14, 1917 – August 6, 1997) was an American mobster and a charter member of the Winter Hill Gang.

Early life
McDonald was born in 1917 in Somerville, Massachusetts. He was of Scottish and Irish descent.

Winter Hill Gang
McDonald was one of the originators of the Irish/Italian Winter Hill Gang and was a close friend and mentor to mob bosses Buddy McLean and Howie Winter. A veteran of World War II, McDonald was a skilled contract killer. In 1963, he escaped from prison while serving a 12 to 18 year sentence for armed robbery. Along with twenty-one other associates, including Winter, McDonald was indicted on charges of fixing horse races in 1979. He subsequently went on to be a fugitive in Florida. Later, while on the lam, McDonald and associate, Johnny Martorano, murdered businessman Roger Wheeler in Tulsa, Oklahoma.

Personal life
Joe had one brother, Leo McDonald, who was also a criminal affiliated with the Winter Hill Gang. McDonald died of a stroke in 1997.

References

1917 births
1997 deaths
People from Somerville, Massachusetts
American gangsters of Irish descent
American gangsters
American people of Scottish descent
Winter Hill Gang
Gangsters from Boston
American military personnel of World War II